Events from the year 1708 in France.

Incumbents 
Monarch: Louis XIV

Events
23 March - James Stuart, the "Old Pretender", having sailed from Dunkirk with 5000 French troops, with the intention of invading Britain, attempts to land in the Firth of Forth; the attempt is thwarted by the Royal Navy, under Admiral Byng.

Births
10 January - Donat Nonnotte, painter (died 1785)
26 March - Louis Guillouet, comte d'Orvilliers, admiral (died 1792)
2 September - André le Breton, publisher (died 1779)

Deaths
5 March - Charles Le Gobien, Jesuit writer (born 1653)
23 April - Jacques Gravier, Jesuit missionary (born 1651)
11 May - Jules Hardouin Mansart, architect (born 1646)
28 December - Joseph Pitton de Tournefort, botanist (born 1656)

See also

References

1700s in France